Shovel Creek is a waterway in the U.S. state of Alaska, near Nome. Through the greater part of its course, it spreads over wide gravel bars. The bed rock of the Shovel Creek basin consists for the most part of limestones and calcareous mica schists. Near the head of the creek, there are some intrusions of greenstone. Mining operations in the Shovel Creek basin occurred at three small tributaries—Mystery, West, and Kasson creeks.

History
Gasoline engines were used to furnish power. The gravel was washed in a revolving trommel from which the screened material went directly to the sluices and the oversize to a belt stacker.

References

Rivers of the Seward Peninsula
Rivers of Alaska
Rivers of Nome Census Area, Alaska
Rivers of Unorganized Borough, Alaska